Phillip Ko-Fei (June 18, 1949 – March 30, 2017) was a Hong Kong filmmaker.

He directed the movies Angel on Fire, Magkasangga 2000, Kakambal ko sa tapang and Romano Sagrado: Talim sa Dilim.

Filmography

Director

 Sha bao xiong di (1982)
 Ma tou (1983)
 The Brave Platoon (1987)
 Official Exterminator 3: Joy for Living Dead (1987)
 Official Exterminator 2: Heaven's Hell (1987)
 High Sky Mission (1987)
 Angel's Blood Mission (1987)
 Hunting Express (1988)
 American Force 2: The Untouchable Glory (1988)
 The Extreme Project (1988)
 Red Heat Conspiracy (1988)
 Platoon Warriors (1988, Video)
 L.A. Connection (1988)
 Die to Win (1988)
 Mu zhong wu ren (1989)
 A Killer's Romance (1990)
 Dong fang lao hu (1990)
 Zhi zun te jing (1992)
 Conexão Interpol (1992)
 Long kua si hai zhi zhi ming qing ren (1993)
 Magkasangga sa batas (1993)
 Kakambal ko sa tapang (1993)
 Yue gui zhi lang (1994)
 Iyo ang Hong Kong, akin ang Manila! (1994)
 Hong tian mi ling (1994)
 Angel on Fire (1995)
 Matira ang matibay (1995)
 Magkasangga 2000 (1995)
 Hubungan jenayah (1995)
 Bad Blood (1996, TV Movie)
 Sandata (1996)
 Duwelo (1996)
 Bangis (1996)
 Desperate Hours (1997, TV Movie)
 Nightmare Honeymoon (1997, TV Movie)
 Matang agila (1997)
 Kasangga mo ako sa huling laban (1997)
 Buhawi Jack (1998)
 Dian zi ge men zhan shi (1998)
 Hitman's Call (1999)
 Sao hei te qian dui (1999)
 Internet Mirage (1999)
 Black Gun Team (1999)
 Hong qiang dao ying (2000)
 Supercop.com (2000)
 Laban kung laban (2000)
 Xtreme Warriors (2001)
 Payment in Blood (2001)
 Huo xian sheng si lian (2002)

Screenwriter
 Lang man sha shou zi you ren (1990)
 Iyo ang Hong Kong, akin ang Manila! (1994)
 Die xue rou qing (1995)
 Magkasangga 2000 (1995)
 Dian zi ge men zhan shi (1998)
 Sao hei te qian dui (1999)
 Supercop.com (2000)
 Huo xian sheng si lian (2002)

Actor

 The Anonymous Heroes (1971)
 Quan ji (1971)
 The Deadly Duo (1971)
 The Angry Guest (1972)
 The Water Margin (1972)
 The Rendezvous of Warriors (1973)
 Enter the Dragon (1973) - Guard (uncredited)
 Yu nu chou (1973)
 Xiao bi hu (1973)
 Ming yi tiao (1973)
 Chao Zhou da feng bao (1973)
 Dragon Squad (1974)
 Dynamite Brothers (1974) - Tuen's henchman (uncredited)
 Shaolin Vengeance (1974)
 Yi quan yi kuai qian (1974)
 Blood Revenge (1974)
 Rou pu tuan (1975)
 The Black Dragon Revenges the Death of Bruce Lee (1975)
 7 Man Army (1976)
 Super Dragon (1982)
 The Best of Shaolin Kung Fu (1976)
 Qing chang zhan chang (1976)
 Shao Lin zu shi (1976)
 Lü si niang chuang shao lin (1976)
 Heroine Kan Lien Chu (1976)
 Broken House (1976)
 Gan Lian Zhu dai po hong lian si (1977)
 Nan quan bei tui zhan yan wang (1977) - Lung Fong
 One Armed Chivalry (1977)
 Secret Rivals 2 (1977)
 Shen dao liu xing chuan (1977)
 The Invincible Armour (1977)
 Jing wu men xu ji (1977)
 The Four Shaolin Challengers (1977)
 Shao Lin Kung-Fu Mystagogue (1977)
 Return of the Chinese Boxer (1977)
 Shen tui (1977) - Fong Kang / Tu Tang
 Bandits, Prostitutes and Silver (1977) - Three Scar Chief
 Along Comes the Tiger (1977)
 Fighting of Shaolin Monks (1977) - One of the 10 Brothers
 Shaolin Brothers (1977)
 The Criminal (1977)
 Five Kung Fu Daredevil Heroes (1977) - Lama Priest
 Eight Masters (1977)
 Fists of Dragons (1977)
 Sea God and Ghosts (1977)
 The Mysterious Heroes (1978)
 Fury of the Shaolin Master (1978)
 Wu Tang Swordsman (1978)
 Gu jian ying hun (1978)
 Shaolin Tough Kid (1978)
 Wan shi tian jiao (1978)
 The Souls of the Sword (1978)
 Flying Masters of Kung Fu (1978)
 Nanghwabigwon (1978)
 Dragon of the Swords Man (1978)
 Dragon on Fire (1978)
 The Incredible Kung Fu Master (1979
 Iron Dragon Strikes Back (1979)
 Duel of the Seven Tiger (1979) - Sze
 Lie ri kuang feng ye huo (1979)
 Duan jian wu qing (1979) - Tsan Hsin-Chou
 Ti guan (1979) - Master Pao Shen Chang
 Goose Boxer (1979) - Lung Chung Fung
 Hong yi la ma (1979)
 Odaegwanmun (1979) - Priest Wu Kuo
 The Dragon, the Hero (1979)
 Xiong sheng Cai Li Fo (1979)
 The Lawman (1979)
 Fury in the Shaolin Temple (1979)
 Ninja Massacre (1979)
 Death Duel of Kung Fu (1979)
 The Fists, the Kicks and the Evil (1979)
 Fung Kyun Din Teoi (1979) - Drunken master
 2 Wondrous Tigers (1979) - Robert Ko
 She xing zui bu (1980) - The Kuo Housekeeper
 Tian tang meng (1980)
 She mao he hun xing quan (1980)
 Zei zang (1980) - Kao Yu-Cheng
 Two for the Road (1980) - Crazy Horse
 Tiger Over Wall (1980) - Fong
 Mao ling (1980)
 Master Killers (1980)
 The Challenger (1980)
 Manhunt (1980)
 The Mask of Vengeance (1980)
 Any Which Way You Punch (1980)
 Wu ting (1981) - Fingers Hung
 Yong zhe wu ju (1981) - Master Tam
 Xiong xie (1981)
 Ninja Kung Fu Emperor (1981) - Master Fok
 Bing bing zei zei (1981)
 Huo Yuan-Jia (1982) - Master Fok
 Clan Feuds (1982)
 Chi se Xiang Wei she (1982)
 Sha bao xiong di (1982)
 Zei xing (1982)
 Brothers from the Walled City (1982)
 San sheng wu nai shei de cuo (1982)
 The Fearless Jackal (1982)
 Lie mo zhe (1982) - Naiwen
 Shou xing di yu nu (1982)
 Mie men zhi huo (1982)
 Dragon Blood (1982) - Ko Fei Hung
 Shaolin Intruders (1983) - Abbot Jianxing
 Mo (1983)
 The Pier (1983)
 Zhong gui (1983) - Chou Tang
 Mission Thunderbolt (1983) - White Tycoon
 Eight Diagram Pole Fighter (1984) - Abbot
 Bu yi shen xiang (1984)
 Wu ming huo (1984) - Ah-Fai
 Lightning Fists of Shaolin (1984) - Golden Silk Cat
 Police Pool of Blood (1984)
 Sex Beyond the Grave (1984)
 Wo ai Luo Landu (1984)
 Zou huo pao (1984)
 Wang zi cheng chong (1984) - Lung
 Mao tou ying yu xiao fei xiang (1984) - Thug
 Zhi ming jin gang quan (1984, TV Movie)
 Return of Bastard Swordsman (1984)
 Cuo ti ren (1985)
 Yellow Skin (1985)
 Ninja Holocaust (1985)
 Jiao tou fa wei (1985)
 Long fa wei (1985)
 This Man Is Dangerous (1985) - Sgt Philip Chen
 Gui ma fei ren (1985)
 Twinkle, Twinkle, Lucky Stars (1985) - Warehouse Thug #4
 My Mind, Your Body (1985) - Philip
 Heart of Dragon (1985) - Kim's Man #2
 Leng xie tu fu (1985)
 Majestic Thunderbolt (1985) - Phillip
 City Ninja (1985)
 Rivals of Silver Fox (1985)
 Zhu zai chu geng (1986) - Robber
 Millionaires Express (1986) - Mountain Bandit
 Ninja Terminator (1986)
 Nui ji za pai jun (1986)
 Mo fei cui (1986) - Shen
 Liu mang ying xiong (1986)
 Tough Ninja the Shadow Warrior (1986)
 Project Ninja Daredevils (1986)
 Ninja Destroyer (1986)
 The Ultimate Ninja (1986)
 Scared Stiff (1987) - Inspector Chow's Man
 Eastern Condors (1987) - Viet Cong Soldier
 Bo sha (1987)
 Yong ai zhuo yi ren (1987) - Kumaguza's HK Thug
 High Sky Mission (1987)
 Chu nu jiang (1988)
 Guo bu xin lang (1988) - Crazy Eyes
 Dragons Forever (1988) - Thug
 Tiger on Beat (1988) - Heroin dealer
 In the Blood (1988)
 Diamond Ninja Force (1988)
 Fat lut mo ching (1988)
 Wu long zei ti shen (1988) - Ai B
 Hao nu shi ba jia (1988)
 Mong ming yuen yeung (1988) - Lu's Man
 Ying xiong xue (1988)
 The Dragon Family (1988) - Keung's top henchman
 Tong gen sheng (1989) - Fei
 Mu zhong wu ren (1989) - Sergeant Kau
 Hak do fuk sing (1989) - Yakuza
 Magnificent 7 Kung-Fu Kids (1989)
 Just Heroes (1989) - Thug
 Ngoh joi gong woo (1989)
 Tie han rou qing (1989)
 Huang jia fei feng (1989) - Killer Fei
 Battle in Hell (1989)
 Hak do fuk sing (1989)
 Lung foo chuk gang II (1990) - Hood
 Chi se da feng bao (1990) - Ko Mok-Fu
 Born to Fight (1990) (1990) - Crowbar
 Kei bing (1990)
 A Killer's Romance (1990) - 	'Charlie' Chan Ben
 Dong fang lao hu (1990) - Mr. King
 Tian di xuan men (1991) - Film Director
 Ying lun yuet jin (1991) - Yuen Tai-Fei
 Bok geuk cha lou (1991)
 Eastern Heroes (1991)
 Zhi fa wei long (1992) - Sgt. Franco
 Long zhi gen (1992)
 Lang zi sha shou ba wang hua (1992)
 Gui huo de gu shi (1992)
 Zhi zun te jing (1992)
 Son of the Dragon (1992)
 Killer Flower (1992)
 Long kua si hai zhi zhi ming qing ren (1993) - Peter Pang
 Magkasangga sa batas (1993) - Nakada / Chuda (international version) (uncredited)
 An lian ni (1993)
 Kakambal ko sa tapang (1993) - Philip
 Yue gui zhi lang (1994)
 Iyo ang Hong Kong, akin ang Manila! (1994)
 Hong tian mi ling (1994) - Wong Jun Lee / Henry Wong
 Cobra (1994)
 Gun gun hong chun (1995) - Li Tian-Sin
 Angel on Fire (1995) - Rocks / Ko Cheung
 The Adventurers (1995) - Wah
 Magkasangga 2000 (1995) - Benny Gabaldon
 Hubungan jenayah (1995)
 Ultimate Revenge (1995)
 The Vengeance (1995)
 Wei qing zhui zong (1996)
 Sandata (1996)
 Romano Sagrado: Talim sa dilim (1996)
 Batang Z (1996)
 Gik dou jung faan (1998)
 Dian zi ge men zhan shi (1998) - Black Ninja
 Fung lau 3 chong si (1998) - Pau Shu-Hei
 Hitman's Call (1999)
 Sao hei te qian dui (1999)
 Black Gun Team (1999)
 Internet Mirage (1999)
 Lethal Combat (1999)
 Hong qiang dao ying (2000)
 Supercop.com (2000)
 Blood on Bullet (2000)
 Huo wu yao yang (2001)
 Te gong shen die (2001)
 The Story of Freeman (2001) - Iron Wolf
 Ying xiong shen hua (2001)
 Shadow Mask (2001) - Red Wood
 Huo xian sheng si lian (2002)
 The Nugget'' (2002) - Chinese Restaurant Manager (final film role)

References

External links

1949 births
2017 deaths
Hong Kong film directors
Hong Kong television people
People from Negros Occidental